Pilis is a town in Pest County, Hungary.

History
The town was inhabited in prehistoric times, but was abandoned at the end of the Roman rule. Pilis was then first mentioned in 1326. It was destroyed during the Ottoman rule in the 16th century, and was reestablished only in 1711, by János Beleznay, the local landlord. He brought Slovak settlers from Upper Hungary, and built a palace in 1717 for himself and his family. The Beleznay family sold the town and its surroundings in the 19th century to the Nyári family, who renamed the palace to "Beleznay-Nyári palace".

Even though the town's ethnic composition has changed in the last centuries, there is still a sizable Slovak minority which has its own local government that is responsible for keeping the Slovak traditions and memories of Pilis.

Etymology
The name comes from Slavic Pleš – bald (area or mountain), an area with sparse or missing trees or vegetation. There are similar names in several Slavic countries including e.g. Pleš, Slovakia (1319 Pilis).

Some point out the similarity between the Lithuanian word "pilis" (meaning castle) and the Hungarian town's name.

Notable people
Pál Csernai (1932–2013), football player and manager
Tibor Csernai (1938–2012), footballer

Twin towns – sister cities

Pilis is twinned with:
 Piazza al Serchio, Italy

References

External links
Official website
History of Pilis in English at the official website
Street map 

Populated places in Pest County